Nathamuni, also known as Sri Ranganathamuni, (823 CE – 951 CE), was a Vaishnava theologian who collected and compiled the Naalayira Divya Prabandham.
 Considered the first of the Sri Vaishnava acharyas, Nathamuni is also the author of the Yogarahasya, and the Nyayatattva.

Birth and family
Nathamuni is generally considered to have been born in 823 CE and to have died in 951 CE. His birth name was Aranganathan; however, he was known as Nathamuni or literally the Saint-lord (Nathan - lord, muni - saint) An alternative view is that he was born in 582 CE and died in 922 CE. Yet another view is that Nathamuni was born at Viranarayana Puram sometime shortly after 907 CE and flourished in the 10th century. The traditional view that he lived for than 400 years is untenable. It is likely that Nathamuni lived for slightly over a hundred years in that region controlled by the Chola kings before they rose to the peak of their greatness. His birth star was Anusham.

Though there is difficulty in identifying Nathamuni's date of birth and age, he is considered to have lived during the lifetime of Madhurakavi Alvar's parampara (lineage). Vaishnava tradition holds that once, Nathamuni was conversing with his father about the legend of Prabandhams written by the Alvars. His father, Ishvara Bhattar, exclaimed the Prabandhams were long lost, and that they would be impossible to retrieve unless one had the grace of Narayana. Hence, he got interested in this and had set to the pilgrimage to Kumbakonam Sarangapani Temple, where the main deity is worshipped as Aravamudhan. There, he heard priests singing 10 particular pasurams (hymns) dedicated to Aravamudhan (Sarangapani temple's main deity) by Saint Nammalvar. He was overjoyed hearing those and enquired its details. But the priests stated that only 10 pasurams was known to them out of 1,292 written by Nammalvar. He placed immense faith on the Lord Aravamudhan and he visited Thirukurgur, birth place of Madhurakavigal, the disciple of Nammalvar. He enquired about the Prabandhams written by Nammalvar to Madhurakavigal's direct descendants who lived at Thirukurgur. There, the descendants of Madhurakavigal gave 10 pasurams written by Madhurakavigal by the name Kanninun Siruthambu. They also gave information to Nathamuni that, whoever sings these 10 pasurams with dedication, will get contact with Nammalvar himself at Alvarthirunagari, the birth place of the saint himself. But they also questioned him how will he know the count, for which Nathamuni explained, once he finish singing these 10 pasurams 12,000 times, Nammalvar himself will come and he need not bother about the count. He kept full faith in Nammalvar and started singing the pasurams with dedication under the tamarind tree under which Nammalvar himself sat 4,000 years ago (in relation with Nathamunigal's period). Once he completed 12,000 times, Lord Aravamudhan advised Vishvaksenar (the head or the chief of the army of Lord) to go and bless the Saint Nathamuni again as Nammalvar (Nammalvar is believed to be the avatar of Vishvaksena). Thus, Nammalvar himself came in front of Nathamuni and granted him all the 4,000 pasurams of all Alvars instead of just 1,292 written by him. He came back with immense happiness and thanked Aravamudhan and Nammalvar profusely. Nathamuni, thus, revived the Naalayira Divya Prabandham, hence becoming the first acharya of the Sri Vaishnava tradition. Nathamuni is considered to be an incarnation of a Nityasuri in Vaikuntha, named Gajananar. His grand disciple is Ramanuja himself, who is considered as an incarnation of Adiseshan.

The relationship between Nammalvar and Nathamuni is attested by the Guru-paramparā, Divya sūri charita, and Prappannāmŗta. The Prappannāmŗta also attests that Nathamuni was born in the village Viranarayana. Viranarayana is today generally identified as Kattumannarkoil. Nathamuni is said to have died at Gangaikonda Cholapuram. His father's name was Iśvara Bhaṭṭa and his son's name was Iśvaramuni. His grandson was Yamunacharya who was probably named in commemoration of a pilgrimage that Nathamuni took to the banks of the Yamuna along with his son (Iśvara Muni) and daughter-in-law.

It is believed that his other names were Sadamarsana Kula Tilakar, Sottai Kulaththu Arasar, and Ranganatha Acharya.

Life history

Compilation of the Naalayira Divya Prabandham 
He spent time travelling in North India. He learned about Naalayira Divya Prabhandam, but he heard only ten hymns. He wanted the rest. He recited 12,000 times, Kanninun Siruthambu, a poem in praise of Nammalvar. Nammalvar appeared and gave the 4000 hymns (Naalayira Divya Prabhandam). He was the one who brought back the 4000 hymns. In addition to teaching the hymns to his two nephews at Srirangam, he introduced them into the Srirangam temple service at the Sri Ranganathaswamy Temple, Srirangam, where he was the temple administrator.The story goes that Nathamuni, while at the Vishnu temple at Kattumannar Koil his native place, heard some Brahmins from the Southern end of the Peninsula recite Tamil verses of Satakopa addressed to the Vishnu God of Kumbhakonam and was charmed with their sense and diction. He also found that these verses concluded with the words "These 10 out of the thousand, composed by Satakopa". Nathamuni thus placed in the track of research seems to have finally recovered the whole of Satakopa's works and then rearranged them and the extant works of the other Alwars into four collections of about a thousand stanzas each.

Other contributions 
The ritual of worship as followed in Vishnu temples is based on two early standard works. The first being Vaikhanasa Sutra which probably belongs to the Krishna Yajurveda school. The other is the Panchratra Agama which belongs to the extensive Tantra literature, believed to have been composed by Narayana himself. The Agama has a peculiar philosophy of its own, the Bhagavata Tradition, which is ancient and is referred to in the Mahabharata and Badarayana Sutras. Nathamuni made a provision for the recitation of the Tamil Veda on appropriate occasions during the main festivals of the lord. He is thought to be the originator of the Araiyar Sevai.

Anecdotes

The court dancer 
Nammalvar's songs are sung to this day at Srirangam and other places of where Vishnu is worshipped. Nathamuni is said to have set them into music after his discovery of these verses. During that period, a dancing girl sang songs in the same celestial tune (in which Nathamuni set the prabandhams into music) at the court of the Chola king in Gangaikondacholapuram. The tune was rare and could not be appreciated by the common folk and hence the king slighted the dancer. The dancer travelled to the Veeranarayanapuram Vishnu temple and sang before God in the same celestial tune. This was appreciated by Nathamuni who understood the nuances of the tune. On hearing that Nathamuni himself had appreciated the dancer's singing, the king visited the temple and enquired why Nathamuni had appreciated that unfamiliar tune. To display his expertise, Nathamuni ordered several cymbals to be sounded and determined the weight of the cymbals from the pitch of the sound that they produced. This impressed the king and he accepted the superiority of the celestial tune.

There is an inconsistency in this anecdote. During the time of Nathamuni (late 9th century), Uraiyur was the capital of the Chola kings, and Gangaikonda Cholapuram had not been founded yet. However, it is possible that the site of the city was used as an alternative capital or had a palace that was frequented by the kings.

Uyyakondar and his disciple Pundarikaksha 
One of Nathamuni's most illustrious disciples was Pundarikaksha, who hasn't left any literary work behind him. It is believed that Nathamuni had a vision where he foresaw the birth of his grandson Yamunacharya and deputed Pundarikaksha to be his spiritual guru (who in turn deputed his disciple Ramamisra to guide Yamunacharya).

It is said that Nathamuni once asked Pundarikaksha to escort his wife Aravindappavai to the residence of her father Vangi-purathachi. On reaching the house of Vangi-purathachi he was served stale food, as he was from an inferior caste among the Brahmins (Choliah). Yet, he did not resent the apparent slight and indignity, but rather accepted it cheerfully. When Nathamuni heard of this incident, he reckoned that it was a mark of high spiritual advancement and called him by the name of Uyyakondar - saviour of the new dispensation.

References

Further reading

External links 
 Srivaisnava - Britannica Online
 Vedanta Ramanuja Mahadesikan
 Kattumannarkoil Temple, Sriman Nathamuni and Sri Aalavandar life history by Sri U.Ve.Asthagothram Kachi Kidambi T.Sreenivasachari Swamy
 

Sri Vaishnava religious leaders
Medieval Hindu religious leaders
Hindu philosophers and theologians
Indian theologians
Hindu studies scholars
Scholars from Tamil Nadu
Tamil scholars
10th-century Indian scholars
People from Cuddalore district